Animal Nature is the second album by an American nu-disco band Escort, released on October 30, 2015, through Escort Records. The album consists of ten new tracks along with "a handful of alternate edits and remixes of album cuts".

Reception

In a review for Pitchfork, Ilana Kaplan says the album is a more polished production then the band's debut with a little less funk, moving from "funk disco into a late '70s disco/early '80s synth phase, blurring genre lines," and Escort has "hit a nostalgic sweet spot that will never grow old."

Andy Kellman of AllMusic states that "Animal Nature comes across more as the work of a band than of a studio project" and contains "references to specific disco and post-disco artists and bygone production touches less obvious, a little more concealed than they are on the 2011 album." The standout track is "Body Talk", which Kellman calls "a gleaming compound of early-'80s boogie and early-'90s house."

Andy Battaglia of NPR says the members of the band are "vintage dance-music precisionists" but their goal for Animal Nature "is more than just disco in a wide-eyed sound that peers out to stare down the many decades since." He also praises the album's production value, calling it "slick and stylish and light — clearly in thrall to the sound it revisits."

Track listing

References

2015 albums
Escort (band) albums